Alice Evans (born 2 August 1968) is a British-American actress.

Early life
Evans was born in Bristol, England, mathematician David Evans and teacher Janet Evans. She was raised in Bristol, and attended Henbury school, along with her two brothers, Anthony and Philip. She graduated from University College London with a 2:1 in French and Italian.

Career
After graduation, she enrolled at the Cours Florent in Paris. She gained work in French television, with her breakthrough role as French student Susan in the French sitcom, Elisa Top Modele, which ran for 18 months. Next, she went to Italy to play "Nathalie", in the 1998 Italian miniseries Le ragazze di Piazza di Spagna. Her first English-speaking role was in the Highlander episode 'Patient Number 7'. After making her first film, Monsieur Naphtali (1999), Oscar-winning director Claude Lelouch cast Evans as Macha in Une pour toutes (1999), alongside Samy Naceri and Anne Parillaud.

In 1999, Disney cast Evans alongside Glenn Close, Gérard Depardieu and her future husband, Ioan Gruffudd, in 102 Dalmatians. Evans' mother died at age 59, the day before Evans's final screen test for the role, which introduced her to British viewers.

After appearing in Blackball, she moved to Los Angeles in 2003. She has since appeared in both television and film, such as The Mentalist, Brothers & Sisters, Lost, Betty Broderick and  Grimm. Evans also had a recurring turn as the villainous Esther on The Vampire Diaries and The Originals.

Personal life
In 2001, Evans was residing in Paris with her fiancé Olivier Widmaier Picasso, a grandson of painter Pablo Picasso. They were in a relationship for eight years until she broke their engagement by having an affair with Ioan Gruffudd.

Evans first met actor Ioan Gruffudd during the filming of 102 Dalmatians. They became engaged on New Year's Day 2006 and married on 14 September 2007 in Mexico. They have two daughters, born in 2009 and 2013. In January 2021, Evans announced their separation, which Gruffudd initiated. In March 2021, Gruffudd filed for divorce from Evans. In February 2022, Gruffudd filed for, and was granted, a Temporary Domestic Violence Restraining Order against Evans. In August 2022 Gruffudd was granted a 3-year Permanent Domestic Violence Restraining Order against his estranged wife. In January 2023 Evans faced charges over allegedly breaching her Restraining Order on two counts.

In 2017, following a slew of sexual assault allegations against film producer Harvey Weinstein, Evans claimed that 15 years prior, in 2002, Weinstein made sexual advances towards her, which she declined. Evans said that Weinstein intimated that her rejection would affect her career and Gruffudd's as well.

Select filmography

Film

Television

Video games

References

External links

Alice Evans at Ta
 Tattle.life

Living people
1968 births
Actresses from Bristol
Age controversies 
Alumni of University College London
British television actresses
British film actresses
British soap opera actresses
People educated at Hurtwood House
20th-century British actresses
21st-century British actresses
20th-century English women
20th-century English people
21st-century English women
21st-century English people